iTunes Live from SoHo may refer to:

iTunes Live from SoHo (Adele EP), 2009
iTunes Live from SoHo  (Audrey Assad album), 2011
iTunes Live from SoHo (Civil Twilight EP), 2010 EP by Civil Twilight
iTunes Live from SoHo (Counting Crows EP), 2008 EP by Counting Crows
iTunes Live from SoHo (The Fray EP), 2009 EP by The Fray
iTunes Live from SoHo (Ladyhawke EP), 2010 EP by Ladyhawke
iTunes Live from SoHo (Linkin Park EP), 2009 EP by Linkin Park
iTunes Live from SoHo (Manchester Orchestra EP), 2010 EP by Manchester Orchestra
iTunes Live from SoHo (Regina Spektor EP), 2009 EP by Regina Spektor
iTunes Live from SoHo (Sara Bareilles EP), 2011 EP by Sara Bareilles
iTunes Live from SoHo (Secondhand Serenade EP), 2009 EP by Secondhand Serenade
iTunes Live from SoHo (Taylor Swift EP), 2008 EP by Taylor Swift
Live from SoHo (The Good, the Bad & the Queen EP), 2007 EP by The Good, the Bad & the Queen
Live from SoHo (Maroon 5 EP), 2008
Live from SoHo (Melody Gardot EP), 2009